

The Eagle Adventist Schoolhouse near Eagle, Idaho, is a -story former school and church constructed in 1912. The wood frame, L-shape building features a small belfry above and behind the main entrance on North Ballantyne Lane. Clapboard siding covers exterior walls, and the building is free of ornamentation. The schoolhouse was added to the National Register of Historic Places in 1980.

The schoolhouse was constructed at the former site of the Ames Academy, a Seventh Day Adventist school and church, constructed in 1908 and destroyed by fire in 1911. At the time of the fire, Ames had 40 students, including 15 students boarding at the school. Ames was relatively self contained, with its own water and electric utilities. An Adventist college had been planned for the site until the fire.

References

External links

		
National Register of Historic Places in Ada County, Idaho
School buildings completed in 1912
School buildings on the National Register of Historic Places in Idaho
Seventh-day Adventist churches in the United States
Former Seventh-day Adventist institutions
1912 establishments in Idaho